Krasov (until 1945 Korunov) is a municipality and village in Bruntál District in the Moravian-Silesian Region of the Czech Republic. It has about 400 inhabitants.

History
The first written mention of Krasov is from 1502. The village was probably founded in 1450.

Notable people
Otto Kittel (1917–1945), German fighter pilot

Gallery

References

Villages in Bruntál District